Mohammed Tharwat Hassan  is a Professor of Physics and Optical Sciences at the University of Arizona in the United States.

Early life 
Mohammed Tharwat Hassan was born on March 30, 1983, in Fayoum, Egypt. He received a Bachelor of Science degree in chemistry from Cairo University  (Fayoum Branch). Then in 2009, he received his master's degree from the National Institute of Laser Science (NILES)-Cairo University. He joined the Max-Plank institute for Quantum Optics as a Max-Plank fellow where he received his Ph.D.  in attosecond Physics.

Education  

 Ph.D. Max-Planck Institute of Quantum Optics, 2013
 M.Sc. in Laser interaction with Matter Cairo University, 2008
 B.S. Cairo University, 2003

Research interests 
Earlier in his career, Mohammed  Hassan developed the light field synthesizer to generate the first optical attosecond pulse, the shortest light pulse documented in the Guinness World Records. Exploiting this tool, he was able to measure the time an electron takes to respond to an external light field. Recently, he demonstrated the shortest, to date, electron pulse in an electron microscope.

Currently, he is known for developing attosecond electron microscopy and attosecond electron diffraction to image the electron dynamics of matter in real-time and space. He has a granted patent for his Attomicroscopy: Attosecond electron imaging and microscopy, US Patent, Application No.16394920. Hassan research aims to image record movies of electrons in action

Awards and honors 
 Max-Planck Research Fellow, 2009 
 The Air Force's Young Investigator Award (YIP 2019).
 The Gordon and Betty Moore Foundation grant award to develop Attomicroscopy electron diffraction for imaging the electron motion in action.
 M. W. Keck research award for Science and Engineering in 2009.

See also 
 Ahmed Zewail
 Ali Moustafa Mosharafa
 Farouk El-Baz

References

External links 

1983 births
Living people
Egyptian physicists
University of Arizona faculty